Steve Asheim (born January 17, 1970) is an American drummer and primary songwriter for the death metal band Deicide. Asheim endorses Pearl, Paiste, Vater, Axis and is known to collect guns, which can be seen in Deicide's DVD When London Burns. Asheim also plays guitar on the album Till Death Do Us Part. On November 20, 2007, Asheim joined the St. Petersburg, Florida-based death/black metal band Order of Ennead as their drummer.

Biography 
Asheim was born in Freehold, New Jersey and is of Norwegian descent through his grandparents who were from Stavanger. His first instrument was the trumpet, but after a few months, he started playing self-taught drums at age 11 and began to play in small bands at 13. He did his first demo in a studio of one of his school teachers in Freehold, New Jersey. In that period, he developed his interest in extreme drumming. He left his former bandmates because they wanted to play Mötley Crüe, while he was interested in playing Metallica and Slayer. In 1985, he moved to Florida and joined "Carnage," where he met Eric and Brian Hoffman. "Carnage" covered Slayer, Exodus, Celtic Frost and Dark Angel songs. After Carnage disbanded in 1986, Asheim and the Hoffman brothers started writing the early "Amon" songs. In 1987, they met Glen Benton and started demoing. Later, they changed the band name to Deicide.

Influences 
Asheim was inspired by bands such as Metallica, Slayer, Dark Angel, Destruction, and Sodom. and his main drumming influences include Peter Criss, Clive Burr, Buddy Rich, Lars Ulrich and Dave Lombardo. Asheim also plays lead and rhythm guitar, bass guitar and piano. He listens to classical piano to derive a better idea of what is possible in constructing songs and music.

Legal issues 
On 25 January 2007, when making a trip to a bank in Innsbruck, Austria to make a deposit from Deicide merchandise sales, Asheim was arrested on suspicion of connection with a recent bank robbery. Staff were perplexed by his appearance and attire, as well as the fact he was handling money marked in red dye. Detained by police in the local station, he explained the banknotes were legitimate proceeds from touring, and that he had a leaky pen in his pocket which was responsible for the money's discoloration. He was released without further charge.

See also
List of drummers

References 

1970 births
20th-century American drummers
American heavy metal drummers
American male drummers
American multi-instrumentalists
Death metal musicians
Deicide (band) members
Living people
Musicians from New Jersey
Musicians from Tampa, Florida
21st-century American drummers
20th-century American male musicians
21st-century American male musicians
American people of Norwegian descent